Klaus Mitffoch was a Polish rock group founded in 1979 in Wrocław by Lech Janerka, Krzysztof Pociecha and Kazimierz Sycz. Soon joined by Wiesław Mrozik and Marek Puchała (who replaced Sycz on drums), the band gained a large underground following. They recorded their first single Ogniowe Strzelby/Śmielej in 1983 and their debut album Klaus Mitffoch in 1984. It received several awards and is considered one of the most important albums in the history of Polish rock music.

The band disintegrated in 1984. Janerka went on to a long-term solo career; Pociecha collaborated with Janerka on two more albums. From 1986 to 1989 Mrozik and Puchała, joined by Paweł Chyliński (guitar/vocals), Jacek Fedorowicz (bass guitar) and Zbigniew Kapturski (guitar/vocals), continued to perform under the name 'Klaus Mit Foch'; this latter line-up released the album Mordoplan in 1988.

Personnel
 Lech Janerka (bass guitar/vocals)
 Krzysztof Pociecha (guitar/backing vocals)
 Wiesław Mrozik (guitar/backing vocals)
 Marek Puchała (drums/backing vocals)

Discography

Studio albums
 Klaus Mitffoch (1984)
 Mordoplan (1988, as Klaus Mit Foch)

Singles
 Ogniowe Strzelby / Smielej (1983)
 Jezu jak się cieszę / O głowie (1983) 
 Siedzi / Tutaj wesoło (1984)

Notes

References
 

Polish post-punk music groups
Musical groups established in 1979
Polish rock music groups
Polish new wave musical groups
Musical groups disestablished in 1984
1979 establishments in Poland